Frazão is a surname. Notable people with the surname include:

Aline Frazão (born 1988), Angolan singer-songwriter
Nuno Frazão (born 1971), Portuguese fencer
Rui Frazão (born 1970), Portuguese fencer

See also
Frazão Arreigada

Portuguese-language surnames